Jeeves and Wooster is a British comedy-drama television series adapted by Clive Exton from P. G. Wodehouse's "Jeeves" stories. It aired on the ITV network from 22 April 1990 to 20 June 1993, with the last series nominated for a British Academy Television Award for Best Drama Series. Set in the UK and the US in an unspecified period between the late 1920s and the 1930s, the series starred Hugh Laurie as Bertie Wooster, an affable young gentleman and member of the idle rich, and Stephen Fry as Jeeves, his highly intelligent and competent valet. Bertie and his friends, who are mainly members of the Drones Club, are extricated from all manner of societal misadventures by the indispensable Jeeves.

When Fry and Laurie began the series, they were already a popular comedic double act for their regular appearances on Channel 4's Saturday Live and their own show A Bit of Fry & Laurie (BBC, 1987–95).

In the television documentary Fry and Laurie Reunited (2010), the actors, reminiscing about their involvement in the series, revealed that they were initially reluctant to play the parts of Jeeves and Wooster, but eventually decided to do so because the series was going to be made with or without them and they felt no one else would do the parts justice.

The series was a collaboration between Brian Eastman of Picture Partnership Productions and Granada Television.

Theme and opening credits 
The theme (called "Jeeves and Wooster") is an original piece of music in the jazz/swing style written by composer Anne Dudley for the programme. Dudley uses variations of the theme as a basis for all of the episodes' scores and was nominated for a British Academy Television Award for her work on the third series.

Characters 

Many of the programme's supporting roles – including significant characters such as Aunt Agatha, Madeline Bassett and Gussie Fink-Nottle – were played by more than one actor. One prominent character, Aunt Dahlia, was played by a different actress in each of the four series. Francesca Folan played two very different characters: Madeline Bassett in series one and Lady Florence Craye in series four.  The character of Stiffy Byng was played by Charlotte Attenborough in series two and by Amanda Harris in series three and then by Attenborough again in series four. Richard Braine, who took over the role of Gussie Fink-Nottle in series three and four, also appeared as the conniving Rupert Steggles in series one.

Episodes

Reception 

The third series of Jeeves and Wooster won a British Academy Television Award for Best Design for Eileen Diss. The final series won a British Academy Television Award for Best Graphics for Derek W. Hayes and was nominated for a British Academy Television Award for Best Drama Series; it also earned a British Academy Television Award for Best Original Television Music for Anne Dudley and a British Academy Television Award for Best Costume Design for Dany Everett.

In retrospect, Michael Brooke of BFI Screenonline called screenwriter Clive Exton "the series' real star", saying his "adaptations come surprisingly close to capturing the flavour of the originals" by "retaining many of Wodehouse's most inspired literary similes."

Home releases 
Granada Media released all four series on DVD in Region 2 between 2000 and 2002. On 1 September 2008, ITV Studios Home Entertainment released Jeeves and Wooster: The Complete Collection, an eight-disc box set featuring all 23 episodes of the series.

In Region 1, A&E Home Entertainment, under licence from Granada Media Entertainment, released the complete 23-episode collection on DVD in the US and Canada.

In Region 4, Shock Entertainment has released the entire series on DVD in Australia. It was initially released in season sets in 2007/2008, followed by a complete series collection on 4 August 2008.

Locations 

 Interior shots of Skeldings Hall (Bobbie Wickham's house) were filmed at Home House, a historic house in London.
 Totleigh Towers was filmed at Highclere Castle, Hampshire.
 Totleigh-in-the-Wold scenes were filmed in Haddenham, Buckinghamshire; particularly around the duck pond and church.
 Other location shots of "Trouble at Totleigh Towers" were filmed at West End, Waltham St Lawrence, Berkshire.
 Exterior shots of Brinkley Court were filmed at Barnsley Park, Gloucestershire in series 1 and Hall Barn, Buckinghamshire in series 4.
 All interior shots of Brinkley Court were filmed at Wrotham Park, Hertfordshire.
 Interior and exterior shots of Chuffnell Hall, in series 2, were also filmed at Wrotham Park.
 Shots of Chuffnell Regis, Devon were filmed in Clovelly, Devon and High Street, Long Crendon, Buckinghamshire
 Scenes from "Bertie Sets Sail" were filmed in Halton House, Buckinghamshire
 Chuffnell Regis Station shots were filmed at Horsted Keynes station – Bluebell Railway, Sussex.
 Ditteridge Hall ("Jeeves Takes Charge") was filmed at Englefield House, Berkshire.
 Twing Hall ("The Purity of the Turf") was filmed at Stanway House, Gloucestershire.
 The "Victoria Hotel" and the "Hotel Riviera" in Westcombe-on-Sea ("Pearls Mean Tears") were filmed in Sidmouth, Devon.
 Some of the exterior shots in the gardens of the estate in "Jeeves in the Country" are filmed at Polesden Lacey, Surrey.
 Barmy's Aunt's House ("Kidnapped!") was filmed at Clandon Park, Surrey.
 Deverill Hall ("Right Ho, Jeeves") was filmed at Joyce Grove, Oxfordshire.
 Fothergill Hall ("Comrade Bingo") was filmed at Dorney Court, Buckinghamshire.
 Lord Worplesdon's New York City residence ("The Once and Future Ex") was filmed at Gaddesden Place, Hertfordshire.
 Exterior shots of Stuyvesant Towers, Bertie Wooster's residence in New York City in series 3 and 4, were filmed at Senate House in Bloomsbury, the central library and administration building for the University of London.
 Exterior shots of Berkeley Mansions, Bertie Wooster's residence in London, were filmed at 2 Mansfield Street, Marylebone.

References 
Notes

Sources

External links 

 
 
 
 The Russian Wodehouse Society—Episode guides, screenshots and quotes from the four series.

British comedy-drama television shows
1990s British comedy-drama television series
1990 British television series debuts
1993 British television series endings
Television shows based on works by P. G. Wodehouse
ITV comedy
Television series set in the 1920s
Television series set in the 1930s
Television series produced at Pinewood Studios
Television series by ITV Studios
Television shows produced by Granada Television
English-language television shows